Howard O'Neal Adams (January 21, 1919 – October 27, 1998), also known as Neal Adams, was an American professional football and basketball player. Born in El Paso, Arkansas, Adams played both sports for the Arkansas Razorbacks. Professionally, Adams played as an end in the National Football League for the New York Giants (1942–1945) and in the All-America Football Conference for the Brooklyn Dodgers (1946–1947). He also competed in the National Basketball League for the Oshkosh All-Stars during the 1942–43 season and averaged 0.7 points per game.

References

1919 births
1998 deaths
Arkansas Razorbacks baseball players
Arkansas Razorbacks football players
Arkansas Razorbacks men's basketball players
Brooklyn Dodgers (AAFC) players
Centers (basketball)
Forwards (basketball)
New York Giants players
Oshkosh All-Stars players
People from El Paso, Arkansas
Players of American football from Arkansas